The West Indies women's cricket team toured Ireland to play the Ireland women's cricket team in May 2019. The tour consisted of three Women's Twenty20 Internationals (WT20Is), which took place directly before the West Indies women's team toured England. The West Indies won the series 3–0.

Ahead of the series, Cricket Ireland awarded part-time professional contracts to six of its players. Ireland's captain, Laura Delany, suffered an injury during the first match which ruled her out of the rest of the series. Kim Garth was named as Ireland's captain in her place.

Squads

Reniece Boyce, Shanika Bruce, Britney Cooper, Shabika Gajnabi, Sheneta Grimmond and Shawnisha Hector were also named as reserve players for the West Indies. Ahead of the tour, Deandra Dottin was ruled out of the West Indies' squad due to injury, and was replaced by Britney Cooper. Anna Kerrison was added to Ireland's squad for the last two matches.

WT20I series

1st WT20I

2nd WT20I

3rd WT20I

Notes

References

External links
 Series home at ESPN Cricinfo

2019 in West Indian cricket
2019 in Irish cricket
International cricket competitions in 2019
Ireland 2019
cricket
2019 in women's cricket
May 2019 sports events in Ireland